"One More Time, One More Chance" (also listed as "One more time,One more chance") is a single by Japanese singer Masayoshi Yamazaki that was released on January 22, 1997 on the Polydor Japan label. It peaked on the Oricon weekly singles chart at No. 18 and charted for 24 weeks.

It is used as the ending theme song for the 2007 film 5 Centimeters Per Second. As the song is played in a convenience store, the film's male lead, Takaki Tōno, recognizes it as a hit song since his junior high school. It was re-released on March 3 of that year under the label Nayutawave Records and reentered the chart at No. 52.

Track listing and album information

Original
 One More Time, One More Chance
 
 One More Time, One More Chance (karaoke)

Composer: Masayoshi Yamazaki

Arrangement: Toshiyuki Mori, Kitaroh Nakamura

Vocals: Masayoshi Yamazaki

Lyricist: Masayoshi Yamazaki

Re-release
 One More Time, One More Chance
 
 

Composer: Masayoshi Yamazaki

Arrangement: Toshiyuki Mori, TENMON

Vocals: Masayoshi Yamazaki

Lyricist: Masayoshi Yamazaki

Lyrics

Cover versions
 Beni Arashiro released an English version of the song in track 5 of the album Covers on March 21, 2012. The English lyrics were literally translated from the original Japanese.
 Koda Kumi covered this song in Track 5 of her album Color the Cover in 2013.
 Akina Nakamori covered the song in her album "Belie" released in 2016 as well as an accompanying music video.
Park Chanyeol from the K-pop group EXO made a cover of the song on September 25, 2016.
 Little Glee Monster covered the song in the album "Joyful Monster," released January 6, 2017.
Astel Leda from the VTuber group Holostars released a cover of the song on December 7, 2020.

References

1997 singles
Japanese film songs
1997 songs
Songs about heartache
Songs about death